Tom Briscoe (born 19 March 1990) is an English professional rugby league footballer who plays as a er for the Leigh Leopards in the Betfred Super League and has played for England at international level.

He previously played for Leeds Rhinos and Hull F.C. in the Super League.

Briscoe holds the record for most tries in a Challenge Cup final with five.

Background
Briscoe was born in Featherstone, West Yorkshire, England.

Club career

Hull F.C.
Briscoe signed for Hull F.C. from Amateur team Featherstone Lions, and made his Super League début in the opening game of the 2008 season for Hull against Warrington at the Halliwell Jones Stadium.

Following his impressive start to the 2009 season, Briscoe signed a new five-year contract which kept him at the KC Stadium until the end of the 2013 season. 

In 2010 Tom was joined in the Hull F.C. squad by younger brother Jack, who graduated from the Academy.

Leeds Rhinos
On 2 October 2013, Briscoe signed for Leeds, joining up with his younger brother Luke. On 16 February 2014, Briscoe made his début for the Leeds Rhinos, scoring at hat-trick of tries against Hull Kingston Rovers at the KC Lightstream Stadium in a 34-6 win and scored 8 tries in his first 10 appearances in a very successful start to his Leeds Rhinos career. Briscoe played in the 2014 Challenge Cup Final victory over the Castleford Tigers at Wembley Stadium.
In the 2015 Challenge Cup Final on 29 August 2015, Briscoe scored five tries, the first player to achieve this at Wembley Stadium, as Leeds defeated Hull Kingston Rovers 50-0.  Briscoe was named Lance Todd Trophy winner for his performance in this match.

Briscoe played in the 2015 Super League Grand Final victory over the Wigan Warriors at Old Trafford.
Briscoe played in the 2017 Super League Grand Final victory over the Castleford Tigers at Old Trafford.
Briscoe played for Leeds in the 2020 Challenge Cup Final and scored a try in a 17-16 victory over Salford at Wembley Stadium.
Briscoe played a total of 26 games for Leeds in the 2021 Super League season including the club's 36-8 loss against St Helens in the semi-final.
On 24 September 2022, Briscoe played for Leeds in their 24-12 loss to St Helens RFC in the 2022 Super League Grand Final.

Leigh
On 20 October 2022, Briscoe signed a contract to join the newly promoted Leigh side.

International career
Briscoe was also rewarded for his fine club form in the early stages of the 2009 season by being included in the first batch of players to be called up to the England Elite Training squad.

Briscoe made his England debut, scoring a brace of tries against Wales in October 2009. Later that year he was selected in Englands Four Nations squad, playing against France and Australia. At the end of 2010, Briscoe played his first game for England outside of the United Kingdom, in a friendly match against a New Zealand Māori side and then went on to face the full New Zealand team in the Four Nations. In 2011, Briscoe was selected to face the rugby league at Headingley Carnegie Stadium in the first ever International Origin match. He subsequently became established in the England team.
Briscoe was selected in the England squad for the 2013 Rugby League World Cup.

Honours

Club
 Super League (2): 2015, 2017
 League Leader's Shield (1): 2015
 Challenge Cup (3): 2014, 2015, 2020

Individual
Lance Todd Trophy (2015)
Super League Dream Team (2011).              Scored 5 try's at Wembley and broke record 2015

References

External links
Leeds Rhinos profile
Hull profile
SL profile
(archived by web.archive.org) Stats → PastPlayers → B at hullfc.com

1990 births
Living people
England national rugby league team players
English rugby league players
Hull F.C. players
Lance Todd Trophy winners
Leeds Rhinos players
Leigh Leopards players
Rugby league centres
Rugby league players from Featherstone
Rugby league wingers